Wendy Kaplan (also known as Wendy Foxworth; born February 19, 1966) is a film, television, and stage actress probably best known for her role in the 1989 horror movie Halloween 5: The Revenge of Michael Myers.

Career
She is best known for her role in the 1989 horror movie Halloween 5: The Revenge of Michael Myers as Tina Williams. Wendy Kaplan's most recent film role is in the 2005 movie Blood Deep.  Kaplan appeared on the soap opera Guiding Light as Eleni Andros Spauding Cooper from 1994-1995. She played the wife of Brian Wilson in the 1990 TV-movie Summer Dreams: The Story of the Beach Boys. Kaplan made guest appearances on Alien Nation, Law & Order, Police Story, and My Two Dads among others.  She has performed major roles in diverse regional theater productions.

In recent years, Kaplan has appeared in numerous TV commercials for a variety of products.

Filmography

References

External links

American film actresses
American soap opera actresses
American television actresses
1966 births
Living people
21st-century American women